Satria Muda Pertamina is an Indonesian basketball team seeing action through the Perbasi's highest division since 1996. Based in the Indonesian capital of Jakarta, it is Indonesia's representative team to the inaugural Asean Basketball League.  Affectionately called "SM Pertamina" or "SMP".

History
Founded by Doedi Gambiro on October 28, 1993, initially known as Satria Muda, it began play in the KOBATAMA since 1996, and advanced to the final four, but loses to Aspac Jakarta and only get the fourth places after losing to Bima Sakti Nikko Steel Malang, and get "the best newcomers" tribute award in 1996. So, in 1997, Satria Muda endorsed by The Coca-Cola Company's AdeS mineral waters, and the team identity has changed to AdeS Satria Muda. The loses of the 1996 final four is inspired the "Indonesian basketball el-clasico" between Satria Muda and Aspac Jakarta, especially in the grand finals since 2002.

According to Dwui "Iboy" Eriano, unfortunately, in 1998, they never won in this season. But, in 1999, when Erick Thohir's PT Abdi Bangsa Tbk began as the team's major sponsor, and change the team's identity to Mahaka Satria Muda, they changed 180-degrees and "bounce-back" through depose 2-times (1997-1998) champion Panasia Indosyntec Bandung in the final four and dethroning the Surakarta's Bhinneka Sritex in the grand finals.

Satria Muda then made the jump to the Indonesian Basketball League upon the latter's foundation in 2003.  A year later, Bank Rakyat Indonesia, through its BritAma savings account, became the team's major sponsor, and since then the team identity has been Satria Muda BritAma. In the 2015, Pertamina, became the team's major sponsor, and the team name becoming Satria Muda Pertamina.

It has won ten domestic titles (1999, 2004, 2006, 2007, 2008, 2009, 2010–11, 2011–12, 2014–15, and 2018) and has also won the SEABA Champions Cup in 2008 by dethroning Philippines' Harbour Centre Batang Pier.

Satria Muda is one of the six founding teams of the first pan-Asean pro ball league, which began play on 11 October 2009, but will still remain in the Indonesian Basketball League.  In the ASEAN Basketball League, it allows them to add two foreign reinforcements and up to three players from Asean countries.  It finished third overall in the regular season standings and became the runners-up in the inaugural season of the ABL, losing to the Philippine Patriots, 0–3, in the championship.

For the 2010–11 season, the Satria Muda ballclub will be fielding two teams for the ABL and the domestic NBL Indonesia, respectively. The team competing in the NBL will be composed of the 2009–10 ABL team, while the new ABL team is a mixture of new local players, Filipino imports, and American imports.

Honours

Achievements (2009–10)

Current roster

Players in National Teams

SMP Legends

Notable players
- Set a club record or won an individual award as a professional player.
- Played at least one official international match for his senior national team at any time.

 Hardianus Lakudu
 Johannis Winar
 Syahrizal Affandi
 Dwui Eriano
 Rony Gunawan
 Amin Prihantono
 Fictor Gideon Roring
 Amran Andi Sinta
Wellyanson SItumorang

References

External links
 The official website of Satria Muda BritAma

ASEAN Basketball League teams
Basketball teams established in 1993
Basketball teams in Indonesia
Sport in Jakarta
1993 establishments in Indonesia